Fereshteh Molavi (born 19 September 1953, Tehran) is an Iranian-Canadian fiction writer and essayist. She is also a renowned scholar and translator.

Biography
Born in Tehran a month after the coup in 1953, she was raised and worked there as a writer, editor, translator, and research librarian until 1998. While in Iran, unable to publish some of her works due to censorship and war, she compiled a comprehensive bibliography of short stories in Persian. She also translated numerous works by internationally-known writers, including Juan Rulfo and Arnold Hauser. In 1987 she won the Asian Cultural Centre for UNESCO Scholarship Award (Tokyo) for her translations, but she was barred from leaving the country by the Harasat (Intelligence Agency) office of the Ministry of Higher Education. A year later, she won the Best Translation Award (The Institute for the Intellectual Development of Children and Young Adults, Tehran). After ceasefire in 1988, she published her first novel, Khaneh-ye abr-o-bad (The House of Cloud and the Wind); her first collection of short stories, Pari Aftabi (The Sun Fairy); and two other fiction works, The Orange and the Lime and The Persian Garden. The Orange and the Lime was admired by the Children’s Book Council (Tehran, 1993) and nominated for « Les prix graphiques », Octogonales du CIELJ (Centre International d’Etudes en Littérature de Jeunesse, Paris, 1994). 
After moving to Canada in 1998, she worked in various survival jobs for several years. She then had professional careers. She was the Persian bibliographer at Sterling Library (Yale University). She also taught Persian language and literature at University of Toronto and York University, and essay writing at Seneca College. As a member of PEN Canada, she was a fellow at Massey College and a lecturer-in-residence at George Brown College. Listen to the Reed, a chapbook based on her dialogue with the Canadian award-winning writer Karen Connelly, was published by PEN Canada in 2005. Molavi has had readings in Sweden, US, and Canada. She has appeared in many Persian and English anthologies, among them, Speaking in Tongues and TOK. Since 2009 she has published two novels and two collections of short stories. One of the novels, Dow pardeh-ye fasl (The Departures of Seasons), was admired by the Mehregan Literary Award (Tehran, 2012). Due to censorship in Iran, her collection of essays, An sal’ha, in jostar’ha (Those Years, These Essays) has been released in Paris. 
Writing in Persian and English, she now lives in Toronto and divides her time among writing, organizing and running Tehranto Book-of-the Month Club (a monthly event for the promotion of Persian books), and advocating freedom of speech and human rights in Iran.

Major works 
 Zard-khakestari [Yellow-Grey] (collection of short stories, 2012)
 Hala key banafsheh mikari?[Narrative from April to February] (novel, 2012)
 Khaneh-ye abr-o-bad [The House of Cloud and the Wind] (novel, 1991. Reprinted, 2011)
 An salha in jostarha [Those Years, These Essays] (collection of personal essays, 2010)
 Dou-e pardeh-ye fasl [The Departures of Seasons] (novel, 2010)
 Sagha va adamha [Of Mutts & Men] (collection of short stories, 2010) 
 Bolbol-e sargashteh [The Wandering Nightingale] (collection of short stories,  2005) 
 Listen to the Reed: A Dialogue Between Karen  Connelly & Fereshteh Molavi That Took Place in 2003 and 2004 (2005)
 Fehrest-e mostand-e asami-e mashahir va mo’alefan [The Name Authority List of Authors and Famous People] (editor, 1997, 2 v.)
 Bagh-e Irani [The Persian Garden] (1995)
 Narenj-o-toranj [The Orange and the Lime] (1992)
 Pari-ye aftabi [The Sun Fairy] (collection of short stories, 1991) 
 Ketabshenasi-ye dastan-e kutah [A Bibliography of Short Stories] (1991)

Links to Some Works 
 “Jardin Persan” in La Revue de Teheran 
 “The Ravine” in Maple Tree Literary Supplement 
 “That Song" in Ascent Aspirations”
 “Listen to the Reed” in ICORN
 “Iranian Women Writers and Their Narratives” in Gozaar

References

External links
Fereshteh Molavi Emerging Voice 2006 

1953 births
People from Tehran
Iranian women short story writers
Iranian women novelists
Iranian novelists
Living people